Sandusky is a city in and the county seat of Erie County, Ohio, United States. Situated along the shores of Lake Erie in the northern part of the state, Sandusky is located roughly midway between Toledo ( west) and Cleveland ( east). According to 2020 census, the city had a population of 25,095, and the Sandusky micropolitan area had 75,622 residents.

Sandusky is home to the Cedar Fair Entertainment Company, which owns large amounts of property in Sandusky. These properties include Cedar Point, Cedar Fair's flagship park and one of the most popular amusement parks in the world, as well as Cedar Point Shores, adjacent to Cedar Point itself. In 2011, Sandusky was ranked No. 1 by Forbes as the "Best Place to Live Cheaply" in the United States due to its high median family income of $64,000 compared to its relatively low cost of living. The National Arbor Day Foundation has designated Sandusky as a Tree City USA.

Etymology
The accepted etymology is that the name "Sandusky" is derived from the Wyandot word saundustee, meaning "water" or andusti, "cold water." In his 1734 history of New France, Charlevoix transliterated the word as "Chinouski."  Sandusky Bay, formed at the mouth of the Sandusky River, is identified as "Lac (Lake) Sandouské" on a 1718 map by Guillaume DeLisle. The name "L.(Lac) Sandoski" appears on a 1733 map. Sandusky Bay was also called Lac Ondaské, in another French transliteration of the Wyandot.

The river and bay gave rise to a number of eponymous forts and settlements along their shores. These consisted of the short-lived English trading post Fort Sandusky north of the bay, the French Fort Sandoské that replaced it, the British Fort Sandusky on the south shore of the bay, the American Fort Sandusky (later Fort Stephenson) upriver at Lower Sandusky (now known as Fremont, Ohio), as well as the Wyandot Indian village of Upper Sandusky farther upriver.

Another, less accepted etymologic version claims that the city's name goes back to an American trader and frontiersman named Anthony Sadowski, a neighbor of the Boone family and co-founder of Amity village. He was employed by the governor of then British Pennsylvania as a trader and interpreter, speaking several Indian languages, especially Iroquois. He moved to the Pennsylvania frontier in January 1712 and could easily have made it to Lake Erie by 1718 to establish a trading post. One genealogical line of his descendants is actually called "Sandusky."

History

This area was a center of trading and fortifications since the 18th century: the English, French, and Americans had trading posts and forts built on both the north and south sides of Sandusky Bay. George Croghan was one of the more prominent men who operated in this area in the 18th-century. A federal fur trade factory was established in 1808 but was lost at the beginning of the War of 1812.

Development by European Americans of the city of Sandusky, starting in 1818, on the southeast shore of Sandusky Bay, followed settlement of the war of 1812. Part of the city quickly enveloped the site of an earlier small village named Portland (established about 1816). Sandusky was incorporated as a city in 1824. Eventually the city of Sandusky encompassed most of the entire township that had been called Portland. Some of the city was built on land formerly occupied by a Native American man named Ogontz, and therefore the city is said to have been built on "Ogontz' place".

Sandusky's rise in the 19th century was heavily influenced by its location at the head of Sandusky Bay. This made it a key point both for the movement of goods and for the movement of people. The mild climate caused by its proximity to Lake Erie also caused it to become the center of Ohio's wine industry. The presence of limestone was also key to its development. It was also a key location for ice harvesting in the 19th century. Lumber transport, stone quarrying and, in the early 20th century, manufacturing have all been key in the city's history.

Prior to the abolition of slavery in the United States, Sandusky was a major stop for refugee slaves on the Underground Railroad, as some would travel across Lake Erie to reach freedom in Canada. Although Ohio was a free state, they felt at risk from slavecatchers because of bonuses offered under the Fugitive Slave Act of 1850. As depicted in Harriet Beecher Stowe's novel Uncle Tom's Cabin (1855), many refugee slaves seeking to get to Canada made their way to Sandusky, where they boarded boats crossing Lake Erie to the port of Amherstburg in Ontario.

Sandusky's original plat was designed by surveyor Hector Kilbourne according to a modified grid plan, known today as the Kilbourne Plat. Kilbourne later became the first Worshipful Master of the first Sandusky Masonic Lodge, known as Science Lodge #50, still in operation on Wayne Street. His design featured a street grid with avenues cutting diagonally to create patterns reminiscent of the symbols of Freemasonry.

On September 17, 1835, Sandusky was the site of groundbreaking for the Mad River and Lake Erie Railroad, which brought change to the town. Industrial areas developed near the railroad and goods were transported through the port. The coal docks located west of downtown still use a portion of the original MR&LE right-of-way. In 1838 Erie County, Ohio was formed by the state legislature and Sandusky was designated the county seat. This led to the foundation of a court house and Sandusky becoming a regional government center. In 1846 Sandusky had a population of approximately 3,000 people. At that point Sandusky had two railroads and was also a main focus of lake traffic. The town then consisted of many stores, two printing offices, two machine shops, two banks, six churches, one high school, and several iron furnaces.

Since the late 20th century, Battery Park Marina was developed on the original site of the MR&LE Railroad  after restructuring of the industry reduced traffic on the line. The tracks that ran through downtown Sandusky have since been removed. Most of the downtown industrial area is also being redeveloped for other purposes, including mainly marina dockage.

The English author Charles Dickens visited the city in 1842, and briefly wrote of it in his subsequent travelogue, American Notes. Said Dickens, who rode the newly constructed MR&LE railroad from Tiffin:

At two o'clock we took the railroad; the travelling-on which was very slow, its construction being indifferent, and the ground wet and marshy; and arrived at Sandusky in time to dine that evening. We put up at a comfortable little hotel on the brink of Lake Erie, lay there that night, and had no choice but to wait there next day, until a steamboat bound for Buffalo appeared. The town, which was sluggish and uninteresting enough, was something like the back of an English watering-place out of the season.

By 1880 Sandusky had risen to a population of 16,000. There were then 20 churches and three newspapers in the community. The city boasted 29 businesses with at least 10 employees. Products being products included lime, railroad locomotives and cars, carriages, wheels, crayons, chalk, beer, paper, baskets, and tools. By 1886 Sandusky was the center of wood wheel manufacture in the United States. It was also the location of the Ohio State Fish hatchery and the Ohio Soldiers and Sailor's Home.

The city developed as a center of paper-making. With a mill in the industrial area near the lake, the Hinde & Dauch Paper Company was the largest employer in the city in the early 1900s.

As the 20th century progressed, the economy of Sandusky came to focus mainly on tourism and fishing.

Geography

Geography

Sandusky is located at  (41.446741, −82.709092).

Sandusky occupies the defunct township Portland and borders the following townships:
Margaretta Township - west and south
Perkins Township - south
Huron Township - east
Venice Heights - Southwest

Climate
Sandusky has a humid continental climate (Köppen climate classification Dfa), typical of the Midwestern United States, with warm summers and cold winters. Sandusky averages  of snow per winter. Summer weather is more stable, generally humid with thunderstorms. Fall usually is the driest season with many clear warm days and cool nights.

Local areas

Historically, the Wyandot used the term andoske to refer to the river, the bay, and the general area where the city of "Sandusky" later developed. This practice was also used by French and English settlers in the area. Often in historical documents, the word "Sandusky" is used without clarification as to which specific site or location is being referred to. Historical references to "Sandusky" might mean any one of the following locations, depending also on the date of the reference.

List of locations, with approximate dates of usage:
 Sandusky/Sandusky City - about 1817* to present, village/city on southeast side of Sandusky Bay (*-any "Sandusky" reference dated prior to 1817 would not refer to this village, as it was not officially established by this name until 1818).
 Sandusky Bay - 1700 to present; early variants were "(Lac d')Otsanderket", "(Lac d')Otsandoske", "Lake Sandoskė".
 Sandusky River - 1740s to present. 
 Fort Sandusky - various locations: c. 1745, an English trading post on the northern side of the bay. c.1754, a French fort ("Fort Janundat") was built on the southern side of the bay. Later in the French and Indian War, the British built Fort Sandusky on the southeastern side of Sandusky Bay. From about 1812/1813, this referred to a fort (later called "Fort Stephenson") on the Sandusky River, near present-day Fremont, Ohio.
 Lower Sandusky - 1760s to 1849, area or village at the site of what is now the city of Fremont. 
 Upper Sandusky - 1760s? to present, area or village at the falls, which later developed as the current city of Upper Sandusky. Upper Sandusky is south of Sandusky and upriver of it. While a common first impression is that "Upper" implies "north of", here "Upper" refers to "upstream", as in upstream of Lake Erie by means of the Sandusky River.

Demographics

2010 census

As of the census of 2010, there were 25,793 people, 11,082 households, and 6,415 families residing in the city. The racial makeup of the city was 70.4% White, 22.0% African American, 0.4% Native American, 0.6% Asian, 1.1% from other races, and 5.5% from two or more races. Hispanic or Latino of any race were 4.9% of the population.

There were 11,082 households, of which 29.4% had children under the age of 18 living with them, 32.9% were married couples living together, 19.7% had a female householder with no husband present, 5.2% had a male householder with no wife present, and 42.1% were non-families. 35.1% of all households were made up of individuals, and 12.1% had someone living alone who was 65 years of age or older. The average household size was 2.28 and the average family size was 2.93.

The median age in the city was 38.5 years. 23.9% of residents were under the age of 18; 9.3% were between the ages of 18 and 24; 24.2% were from 25 to 44; 27.7% were from 45 to 64; and 15% were 65 years of age or older. The gender makeup of the city was 47.6% male and 52.4% female.

2000 census

As of the census of 2000, there were 27,844 people, 11,851 households, and 7,039 families residing in the city. The population density was 2,770.5 people per square mile (1,069.7/km). There were 13,323 housing units at an average density of 1,325.7 per square mile (511.8/km). The racial makeup of the city was 74.50% White, 21.08% African American, 0.29% Native American, 0.26% Asian, 0.01% Pacific Islander, 0.97% from other races, and 2.88% from two or more races. Hispanic or Latino of any race were 3.09% of the population.

There were 11,851 households, out of which 28.9% had children under the age of 18 living with them, 38.7% were married couples living together, 16.4% had a female householder with no husband present, and 40.6% were non-families. 34.9% of all households were made up of individuals, and 13.1% had someone living alone who was 65 years of age or older. The average household size was 2.31 and the average family size was 2.99.

In the city the population was spread out, with 25.8% under the age of 18, 9.2% from 18 to 24, 28.5% from 25 to 44, 21.4% from 45 to 64, and 15.1% who were 65 years of age or older. The median age was 36 years. For every 100 females, there were 89.4 males. For every 100 females age 18 and over, there were 85.2 males.

The median income for a household in the city was $31,133, and the median income for a family was $37,749. Males had a median income of $31,269 versus $21,926 for females. The per capita income for the city was $18,111. About 12.2% of families and 15.3% of the population were below the poverty line, including 22.7% of those under age 18 and 10.2% of those age 65 or over.

Economy

Top employers
According to Sandusky's 2017 Comprehensive Annual Financial Report, the top employers in the city are:

Tourism
The Jackson Street Pier is a newly renovated tourism destination in Downtown Sandusky on Shoreline Dr. It features an event center, great lawn, ferry dock, selfie locations, boardwalk around the edge, benches, fishing, ice cream vendors, and more. 

Sandusky has a tourism industry fueled by Cedar Point, the neighboring islands, boating, and more recently by its many indoor and outdoor water parks. It is also noted for being the location of the (fictional) "Callahan Auto Parts" in the movie Tommy Boy.

Cedar Point

Cedar Point is a major American amusement park located on Sandusky's coast on Lake Erie. One of America's oldest theme parks and popularly known as "America's Roller Coast", the park has the second largest collection of roller coasters at 17, behind only Six Flags Magic Mountain.

Islands
May through August every year, Sandusky residents and incoming tourists flock to the neighboring islands north of the city, with many transportation options leaving right from downtown. The islands include Kelleys Island, South Bass Island (host of the popular village known as Put-in-Bay), Middle Bass Island and North Bass Island.

Themed parties are a common occurrence in the summer season throughout Sandusky and on the neighboring islands, such as "Island Fest", "Rock on the Dock", and "Christmas in July"; thousands of residents and tourists join in the festivities annually. In 2008, the residents of Sandusky hosted their first annual "Barge Party", where boats from as far as Toledo and Cleveland came to dock up their boats together at the sandbar, just inside Sandusky Bay. The barge party ensues twice every year, typically in late June and late July.

Waterparks

The tourist draw produced by Cedar Point has attracted resort businesses and waterparks to the area. Major waterparks in and near Sandusky are:

Outdoor
 Cedar Point Shores (formerly Soak City), owned by Cedar Fair
 Monsoon Lagoon (Danbury Township) Ottawa County

Indoor
 Castaway Bay, owned by Cedar Fair
 Great Wolf Lodge (Perkins Township)
 Kalahari (Perkins Township)
 Maui Sands Waterpark & Hotel (Closed because of water damage)
 Rain Indoor Waterpark Located in Quality Inn & Suites (closed)

Museums
Sandusky is home to several museums and historic homes. These include the Cooke-Dorn House historic site which was the home of Eleutheros Cooke, the Follett House Museum which was the home of Oran Follett, the Maritime Museum of Sandusky, the Merry-Go Round Museum, and the Ohio Veterans Home Museum.

Government

City Manager 
The City of Sandusky's top government executive is called the City Manager. Eric Wobser is the current City Manager for the City of Sandusky.

City Commission 
The legislative body of Sandusky is called the City Commission. The current City Commissioners are:

Richard (Dick) Brady; 
Brady is in his second consecutive term on the commission, he is a business owner, and is currently serving as the Ex-oficio Mayor of Sandusky. Brady won re-election in 2021.

Dennis Murray; 
Murray is in his second consecutive term on the commission, he is a trial lawyer, former Ohio House Representative, and the most senior ranking Democrat on the commission. Murray won re-election in 2021.

Micheal Meinzer; 
Meinzer is in his first term on the commission, he is a former Fire Chief for the City of Sandusky Fire Dept. Meinzer brings expertise in safety services to the commission chamber. Meinzer is up for re-election in 2023.

Blake A. Harris; 
Harris is in his first term on the commission, he is a business owner, and a community activist. Harris is up for re-election in 2023.

C. Wesley Poole;
Poole is in his second term on the commission, he previously worked for Firelands Hospital. Poole is up for re-election in 2023.

David Waddington; 
Waddington is in his second consecutive term. He previously served on commission from 2004 to 2011. Waddington is the longest serving commissioner. Waddington is eligible for re-election in 2023, but has stated that he is unlikely to run for office again.

Stephen Poggiali; 
Poggiali was 1 of three to win a seat on Commission on Nov. 2nd, 2021. He previously worked for Erie County, and the City of Sandusky.

Police & Fire 
Safety Service Leaders
Fire Chief: Mario D'Amico Police Chief: Jared Oliver

Education
Sandusky Public Schools enroll 3,775 students in public primary and secondary schools. The district operates 10 public schools including five elementary schools, one middle school, one traditional high school, an alternative high school, a school for gifted students in grades 3–12, and a career center with programs for adults.

Alternatively, St. Mary Central Catholic High School, a private Roman Catholic school associated with Holy Angels Church, St. Mary's Church, and Sts. Peter & Paul Church, focuses on giving students a faith-centered learning environment. Monroe Prep Academy is a private charter school in downtown Sandusky. It is located on E. Monroe St. on Sandusky's East Side.

Sandusky is served by the Sandusky Library, which also operates a branch on Kelleys Island.

Media

Print
Sandusky (along with nearby Port Clinton and the Lake Erie Islands - known in the region collectively as "Vacationland") is served by a daily newspaper, the Sandusky Register.

Radio
Twelve local radio stations serve the Sandusky/Vacationland market. BAS Broadcasting, based in nearby Fremont, owns and operates WCPZ  (hot AC), WMJK  (country), WOHF  (classic hits), WFRO-FM  (AC), and WLEC / (oldies/sports). Elyria-Lorain Broadcasting Co. operates three stations serving the "Vacationland" region, including WKFM  (country), WLKR-FM 95.3 (Adult album alternative) and WLKR / (classic hits). Ideastream Public Media also operates Kent State University-owned WNRK  (NPR news/information), a repeater of WKSU in Kent.

Religious stations include WVMS  (run by the Moody Bible Institute as a repeater of WCRF in Cleveland), WGGN  (Contemporary Christian) and WHRQ  (carrying Toledo-based Annunciation Radio, an EWTN Radio affiliate).

TV
Sandusky has one local television station, religiously oriented WGGN-TV channel 52 (DTV 3). Sandusky's location between Toledo and Cleveland means that the city is also served by stations (albeit at a fringe level) in both of those markets as well.

Transportation

Sandusky Transit System (STS) runs a full-service transit system across the Greater Sandusky Area. Its located at 1230 N. Depot St.

Blue Line: serves the suburban area, route 250, Sandusky Mall, and Kalahari Resort. 
Red: Serves the East side and Downtown.
Yellow: Cedar Point, Sports Center.
Orange: Midtown
Purple: Serves the south side.
Green: Serves the west side.

Amtrak, the national passenger rail system, provides service to Sandusky. There are four trains daily, all arriving in the late night/early morning hours: the Capitol Limited between Chicago and Washington, D.C., via Pittsburgh; and the Lake Shore Limited between Chicago and New York/Boston via Buffalo. The Sandusky Amtrak Station is also home to a Greyhound Lines bus station. Into the 1930s, the Baltimore and Ohio Railroad operated a passenger train from Willard in north-central Ohio, as a section of a Wheeling, WV-Chicago train.

Several ferry boats and routes serve Sandusky. These depart from the Jackson Street Pier, except Jet Express which departs from an adjacent pier.

 M/V Goodtime I - Seasonal daily service to Kelleys Island and South Bass Island.  Also provides special party cruises and charters.
 M/V Pelee Islander - Seasonal scheduled service to Pelee Island connecting to Leamington, Ontario and Kingsville, Ontario.
 Jet Express - Provides seasonal daily service to Kelleys Island, South Bass Island, and Cedar Point which connect to Port Clinton, Ohio. It also provides excursion and cruises. Departs from former Cedar Point pier downtown.

The city was previously served by Griffing Sandusky Airport until its closure in 2013. The community is currently served by Erie–Ottawa International Airport in nearby Port Clinton for general aviation and limited commercial service to the Lake Erie Islands. Today, flights from Detroit Metropolitan Airport, John Glenn Columbus International Airport, Cleveland Hopkins International Airport serve Sandusky.

In terms of road access, Sandusky is a short drive off the Ohio Turnpike (Interstate 90 and Interstate 80), enabling easy transportation to Sandusky from cities like Toledo, Cleveland, and Erie, Pennsylvania via those roads. U.S. Route 6 runs through Sandusky, and both Ohio State Route 4 and U.S. Route 250 converge on Sandusky.

Notable people

 John Beatty (1828–1914), banker, U.S. Representative (1868–73); brigadier general during Civil War
 Bill Berry, drummer for band R.E.M.; lived in Sandusky 1968–1972
 Andrew Biemiller, U.S. Representative from Wisconsin
 Brian Bixler, Major League Baseball player
 Brandy Burre, actress, played Theresa D'Agostino on HBO series The Wire
 Roger Carter, professional darts player
 Chris Castle, folk/Americana singer-songwriter
 Dandridge MacFarlan Cole (1921–65), aerospace engineer, futurist, author
 Henry D. Cooke (1825–81), financier, journalist, railroad executive, politician
 Jay Cooke (1821–1905), Civil War financier, railroad magnate, philanthropist
 Jay Crawford, sportscaster
 Corey Croom, football player
 Thom Darden, defensive back for Cleveland Browns, 1972–1981
 Robert L. Denig, major general, Marine Corps; Sandusky's highest-ranking sea service officer
 John Emerson, born Clifton Paden (1874–1956), actor, playwright, director of silent films
 Chad Fairchild, Major League Baseball umpire
 George Feick (1849–1932), builder of Wyoming State Capitol, buildings in and near Sandusky
 Charles Frohman (1856–1915), producer, co-founder of Theatrical Syndicate
 Daniel Frohman (1851–1940), theatrical producer, film producer
 Andy Gerold, guitarist with Marilyn Manson
 Jon Gruden, NFL head coach and TV analyst
 Fred Kelsey (1884–1961), actor, director
 Dick Kinzel, CEO of Cedar Fair Entertainment Company
 Aaron Kromer, NFL assistant coach
 Jeff Linkenbach, NFL offensive tackle
 William d'Alton Mann (1839–1920), Civil War soldier, businessman, publisher
 Scott May, basketball player, NCAA national champion, 1976 Player of the Year, 1976 Olympic gold medalist; NBA player
 Jackie Mayer, Miss America 1963; section of Route 2 in Erie County is named "Jackie Mayer Miss America Highway"
  Betty Mitchell, theatre director and educator
 Thomas J. Moyer (1939–2010), chief justice of Ohio Supreme Court from 1987 to 2010
 Dennis Murray, Democratic member of Ohio House of Representatives
 George Nichols, light heavyweight boxing champion
 James Obergefell, LGBT rights activist and United States Supreme Court plaintiff in Obergefell v. Hodges
 Catherine Opie, artist, professor of photography at UCLA
 Orlando Pace, offensive lineman in Pro Football Hall of Fame; played for Sandusky High School, which retired his jersey number
 Kevin Randleman, Former UFC Heavyweight Champion, two-time Division I NCAA wrestling champion for The Ohio State University, mixed martial arts fighter
 Blanche Roosevelt (1853–98), opera singer and author
 Edmund Ross, senator whose vote prevented impeachment of President Andrew Johnson
 William F. Schaub (1900–1999), U.S. Assistant Secretary of Army 1961–1962
 Elmer Smith (1892–1984), Major League Baseball outfielder 1914–1925; helped Cleveland Indians win the 1920 World Series
 Brad Snyder, Major League Baseball player
 Todd Stephens, film director, writer and producer
 Orville James Victor (1827–1910), theologian, journalist, abolitionist
 Dave Waddington, powerlifter and strongman; first to break 1,000-pound barrier in squat
 Alvin F. Weichel (1891–1956), Republican in U.S. House of Representatives (1943–1955)

References

External links

 City of Sandusky official website
 

 
Cities in Ohio
Cities in Erie County, Ohio
County seats in Ohio
1818 establishments in Ohio
Ohio populated places on Lake Erie
Populated places on the Underground Railroad
Western Reserve, Ohio
Populated places established in 1818